Dublin Dr Pepper is the popular name for a style of Dr Pepper soft drink made by the Dublin Dr Pepper Bottling Company in Dublin, Texas.  Dublin Dr Pepper followed the original recipe, using cane sugar as the sweetener as opposed to newer high-fructose corn syrup (HFCS).  The Dublin plant formula's use of sugar made it popular among soda fans. According to the corporate headquarters at Dr Pepper Snapple Group, this resulted in clashes with other bottlers and the parent company of Dr Pepper. On 12 January 2012, it was announced that the drink will no longer be produced, after the Dublin Dr Pepper Bottling Company settled the trademark dispute instigated by Dr Pepper Snapple Group. In 2014, the surviving Dublin Bottling Company was the subject of a documentary “Bottled Up: The Battle Over Dublin Dr Pepper” which followed the bottling company as it dealt with the response to the lawsuit and building a new brand without Dr Pepper.

History
Dr Pepper debuted in Waco, Texas in 1885.  The Dublin Dr Pepper Bottling was the oldest remaining Dr Pepper bottler until 2012, producing the beverage continuously since 1891. As the soft drink's first independently owned bottler, owner Sam Houston Prim was given first choice of franchises when franchising of Dr Pepper started in 1925 and, instead of a larger area, chose to formalize an existing, smaller territory, which has remained unchanged.

Most of the machinery in the Dublin Dr Pepper Bottling dates to the 1930s and the plant only runs once a month, enough to refill the roughly 2,000 glass bottles that have circulated for decades.  Since the 1990s, it has outsourced most of its production to Temple Bottling Company, a larger independent Dr Pepper bottler in Texas about 110 miles to the southeast.

Use of cane sugar
During the late 1970s and early 1980s, almost all American soft drink bottlers switched from cane sugar to HFCS (high-fructose corn syrup) because of a rise in the price of sugar for a number of political reasons. However, the owner of Dublin Dr Pepper Bottling Company of Dublin, Texas, refused to switch sweeteners, and so it remained one of few bottlers in the U.S. to continue using cane sugar year round.  Though the Dublin plant is not the only Dr Pepper bottler to have used cane sugar instead of HFCS as a sweetener, the Dublin plant was the most well-known plant to not make the change.  Dr Pepper containing cane sugar carried the Imperial Sugar logo, and thus the variant became popularly known as "Dublin" Dr Pepper.
In addition to Dr Pepper products, the Dublin plant also produced Sun Crest Orange, Triple XXX, and NuGrape in 9-10 ounce returnable bottles. To purchase drinks in the 9-10 ounce returnable bottles, the buyer must first have provided their own crate of empty bottles in order to make an exchange.

Sales
As of 2011, the Dublin Dr Pepper Bottling Company had sales of $7 million a year and sold less than 1% of Dr Pepper's annual U.S. volume.  The Kloster family owns approximately 90% of the bottler.

Operations
The company, having been founded by Sam Houston Prim, was operated by his daughter, Grace Prim Lyon, until her death June 7, 1991. William P. "Bill" Kloster, affectionately known as "Mister Dr Pepper" inherited the company from Grace Prim Lyon and operated it until his death September 27, 1999.  His grandson, Mark Kloster, is now general manager of the family business.

Distribution area issues
Franchise agreements limited the Dublin plant's distribution range to a 44-mile radius of Dublin, an area encompassing Stephenville, Tolar, Comanche and Hico.  However, the plant's use of the original sugar recipe had made the plant popular far beyond its existing franchise agreement.  Each year, as many as 80,000 visitors flocked to Dublin, drawn to the antiquated bottling plant and its old-fashioned soda.

The Soft Drink Interbrand Competition Act of 1980 permits soft drink companies to grant exclusive territorial rights to bottlers.  The rise of internet commerce has led to trans-shipments, in which one bottler's soda is sold in another's territory. These sales cause tension between various bottlers.

Lawsuit 

In June 2011, Dr Pepper Snapple Group, which owns the brand and licenses territory to Dublin Dr Pepper, sued the Dublin Dr Pepper Bottling Company. Dr Pepper Snapple Group, the third-largest U.S. soda company with 2010 revenue of $5.6 billion, accused the Dublin bottler of trademark dilution and stealing sales from other Dr Pepper bottlers by selling outside its approved territory. Among the suit's demands were that the bottler remove "Dublin" from its "Dr Pepper" labels and stop selling the soda beyond a 44-mile radius around Dublin. On 11 January 2012, the Dr Pepper Snapple Group acquired the rights to the Dublin Dr Pepper franchise.

Discontinuation

On 12 January 2012, it was announced that the Dublin Dr Pepper Bottling Company will be known as Dublin Bottling Works and will no longer produce Dublin Dr Pepper in the 6.5 or 10 ounce deposit bottles.  A unit of Dr Pepper Snapple will continue to distribute a sugar-sweetened Dr Pepper for the six-county territory in Central Texas, but the bottles will carry no reference to Dublin. As of today, the Dublin Bottling Works continues to produce various other sugar-sweetened soda products both locally and online.

References

External links

 Dublin Bottling Works
 https://web.archive.org/web/20110703100658/http://www.kwtx.com/home/headlines/Dr_Pepper_Sues_Dublin_Bottler_124681419.html
 https://www.scribd.com/doc/62004283/Dublin-Dr-Pepper-Response

American soft drinks
Dr Pepper-flavored sodas
Erath County, Texas